Las gemelas (English title:The twins) is a Mexican telenovela produced by Ernesto Alonso and transmitted by Telesistema Mexicano.

Beatriz Aguirre starred as protagonist/main antagonist and Rafael Bertrand starred as protagonist.

Cast 
Beatriz Aguirre as Paula/Amelia
Rafael Bertrand as Carlos
Magda Guzmán
Carlos Agostí
Eduardo Noriega

References 

Mexican telenovelas
1961 telenovelas
Televisa telenovelas
1961 Mexican television series debuts
1961 Mexican television series endings
Spanish-language telenovelas